The Tamron 16-300mm F/3.5-6.3 Di II VC PZD MACRO is a superzoom lens designed for digital crop sensor cameras.

External links
Official product page

Superzoom lenses
16-300
Camera lenses introduced in 2014